Palisota is a genus of plant in family Commelinaceae, first described in 1828. It is native to sub-Saharan Africa.

 Species
 Palisota alopecurus Pellegr. - Cameroon, Gabon, Central African Republic, Congo-Brazzaville 
 Palisota ambigua (P.Beauv.) C.B.Clarke  - central Africa from Nigeria to Angola
 Palisota barteri Hook.f. - western + central Africa 
 Palisota bicolor Mast. - Bioko
 Palisota bogneri Brenan - Gabon, Equatorial Guinea
 Palisota brachythyrsa Mildbr. - Cameroon, Gabon, Central African Republic, Congo-Brazzaville, Zaïre
 Palisota bracteosa  C.B.Clarke  - western + central Africa; naturalized in Trinidad & Tobago
 Palisota congolana Hua - Congo-Brazzaville
 Palisota flagelliflora Faden - Cameroon
 Palisota gracilior Mildbr. - Cameroon
 Palisota hirsuta (Thunb.) K.Schum. - western + central Africa 
 Palisota lagopus Mildbr. - Gabon, Central African Republic, Congo-Brazzaville, Equatorial Guinea
 Palisota laurentii De Wild. - Zaïre
 Palisota laxiflora C.B.Clarke - São Tomé, Annobon
 Palisota mannii C.B.Clarke - central Africa from Nigeria to Tanzania
 Palisota myriantha K.Schum - Luanda region of Angola
 Palisota orientalis K.Schum. - Tanzania
 Palisota pedicellata K.Schum - São Tomé, Annobon
 Palisota preussiana K.Schum. ex C.B.Clarke - Bioko, Cameroon, Congo-Brazzaville
 Palisota pynaertii De Wild. - Zaïre
 Palisota satabiei Brenan - Cameroon, Gabon, Equatorial Guinea, Congo-Brazzaville
 Palisota schweinfurthii C.B.Clarke - central Africa from Nigeria to Tanzania and south to Zambia
 Palisota tholloni Hua - Cameroon, Gabon, Central African Republic, Congo-Brazzaville, Zaïre
 Palisota thyrsostachya Mildbr. - Zaïre
 Palisota waibelii Mildbr. - Cameroon

References

 
Commelinales genera
Flora of Africa
Taxonomy articles created by Polbot